Splendeuptychia ackeryi, the Magdalena Valley ringlet, is a species of butterfly first classified in 2009. Its distinguishing feature is unusually hairy mouthparts, which have been compared to a moustache. The specimen was initially collected in the dry Magdalena River Valley of Colombia by Blanca Huertas. It resembles Splendeuptychia toynei which is endemic to Ecuadorian east slope.

References 

Euptychiina
Nymphalidae of South America
Arthropods of Colombia
Magdalena River
Butterflies described in 2009